Centromadia fitchii, common name Fitch's spikeweed or Fitch's tarweed, is a species of North American plants in the tribe Madieae within the family Asteraceae. It is native to California and southwestern Oregon.

Centromadia fitchii is an herb up to 50 cm (20 inches) tall. It produces arrays of numerous yellow flower heads with both ray florets and disc florets.

References

External links
Calflora Database: Centromadia fitchii (Spikeweed)
U.C. Photos gallery Centromadia fitchii — formerly Hemezonia fitchii''.

Madieae
Flora of California
Flora of the Sierra Nevada (United States)
Flora of Oregon
Natural history of the California chaparral and woodlands
Natural history of the California Coast Ranges
Natural history of the Central Valley (California)
Plants described in 1857
Taxa named by Edward Lee Greene
Flora without expected TNC conservation status